Protected areas of South Australia consists of protected areas located within South Australia and its immediate onshore waters and which are managed by South Australian Government agencies.

Jurisdiction
The jurisdiction for legislation of protected areas within South Australia and the immediate onshore waters known officially as ‘the coastal waters and waters within the limits of South Australia' belongs to the South Australian government. The major piece of legislation concerned with the creation and the subsequent management of protected areas is the National Parks and Wildlife Act 1972. Protected areas created by this Act form the majority of South Australia’s contribution to the National Reserve System.

Other state legislation that may create protected areas include the following: Forestry Act 1950, Wilderness Protection Act 1992, Historic Shipwrecks Act 1981, River Murray Act 2003, Adelaide Dolphin Sanctuary Act 2005, Fisheries Management Act 2007, Marine Parks Act 2007, Crown Land Management Act 2009, Arkaroola Protection Act 2012 and Native Vegetation Act 1991.

While the Australian Government does not have the power under the Australian constitution to legislate for protected areas within South Australia, its treaty obligations and its constitutional responsibilities do permit it to develop policy for protected areas and to enter into agreements concerning protected areas. Examples include nomination of sites under the Convention on Wetlands of International Importance (also known as the Ramsar Convention) and establishment of agreements for Indigenous Protected Areas.

National Parks and Wildlife Act 1972

The National Parks and Wildlife Act 1972 (also known as the ‘National Parks Act’) is the principal legislation in South Australia in respect to the establishment and management of protected areas. The act uses the term ‘reserve’ in lieu of the term ‘protected area’ while the agency which administers the act generally uses the term 'park'. It is concerned with the establishment and management of reserves, establishment of sanctuaries, conservation of native plants and animals, declaration of protected animals, the management of protected animals in respect to taking, keeping, farming and harvesting, and the control of hunting.

The act is administered by the Department for Environment and Water (DEW).

, there are around 360 parks across South Australia subject to the act and National Parks Regulations.

The following types of reserves are listed within the Act: national parks, conservation parks, game reserves, recreation parks and regional reserves.

National Parks
National parks are "areas considered to be of national significance due to wildlife, natural features of the land, or Aboriginal or European heritage". As of May 2020, updated December 2021, the following national parks have been declared:

Adelaide International Bird Sanctuary—Winaityinaityi Pangkara
 Belair
 Canunda
 Cleland (2021)
 Coffin Bay
 Coorong
 Deep Creek (2021)
 Flinders Chase
 Gawler Ranges
 Glenthorne–Ityamaiitpinna Yarta (2020)
 Great Australian Bight Marine
 Ikara-Flinders Ranges
 Dhilba Guuranda-Innes
 Kati Thanda-Lake Eyre
 Lake Frome National Park (2021)
 Lake Gairdner
 Lake Torrens
 Lincoln
 Malkumba-Coongie Lakes
 Mount Remarkable
 Munga-Thirri–Simpson Desert (2021)
 Murray River
 Naracoorte Caves
 Nilpena Ediacara National Park
 Nullarbor
 Onkaparinga River
 Vulkathunha-Gammon Ranges
 Wapma Thura–Southern Flinders Ranges National Park (2021)
 Witjira

Conservation Parks

Conservation parks are "areas protected for the purpose of conserving wildlife or the natural or historic features of the land". As of March 2018, updated December 2021 (after five national parks had been created, incorporating several former conservation parks), the following conservation parks have been declared:

 Aberdour
 Acraman Creek
 Aldinga Scrub
 Althorpe Islands
 Angove
 Avoid Bay Islands
 Baird Bay Islands
 Bakara
 Bandon
 Bangham
 Barwell
 Bascombe Well
 Baudin
 Baudin Rocks
 Beachport
 Beatrice Islet
 Belt Hill
 Beyeria
 Big Heath
 Billiatt
 Bimbowrie
 Bird Islands
 Black Hill
 Black Rock
 Boondina
 Brookfield
 Bullock Hill
 Busby Islet
 Butchers Gap
 Calectasia
 Calpatanna Waterhole
 Cap Island
 Cape Blanche
 Cape Gantheaume
 Cape Willoughby
 Caralue Bluff
 Carappee Hill
 Carcuma
 Caroona Creek
 Carpenter Rocks
 Carribie
 Chadinga
 Charleston
 Christmas Rocks
 Clements Gap
 Clinton
 Cocata
 Cooltong
 Corrobinnie Hill
 Cox Scrub
 Cromer
 Cudlee Creek
 Custon
 Cygnet Estuary
 Danggali
 Darke Range
 Desert Camp
 Dingley Dell
 Douglas Point
 Dudley
 Eba Island
 Elliot Price
 Eric Bonython
 Ettrick
 Ewens Ponds
 Fairview
 Ferguson
 Ferries-McDonald
 Finniss
 Fort Glanville
 Fowlers Bay
 Franklin Harbor
 Furner
 Gambier Islands
 Gawler Ranges
 Geegeela
 Giles
 Glen Roy
 Goose Island
 Gower
 Grass Tree
 Greenly Island
 Guichen Bay
 Gum Lagoon
 Gum Tree Gully
 Hacks Lagoon
 Hale
 Hallett Cove
 Hanson Scrub
 Heggaton
 Hesperilla
 Hincks
 Hogwash Bend
 Hopkins Creek
 Horsnell Gully
 Ironstone Hill
 Jip Jip
 Kaiserstuhl
 Kanku-Breakaways
 Kapunda Island
 Karte
 Kathai
 Kellidie Bay
 Kelly Hill
 Kelvin Powrie
 Kenneth Stirling
 Kinchina
 Kulliparu
 Kungari
 Kyeema
 Lake Frome
 Lake Gilles
 Lake Hawdon South
 Lake Newland
 Lake St Clair
 Lashmar
 Lathami
 Laura Bay
 Lawari
 Lesueur
 Leven Beach
 Lincoln
 Lipson Island
 Little Dip
 Lowan
 Lower Glenelg River
 Maize Island Lagoon
 Malgra
 Mamungari
 Mantung
 Marino
 Mark Oliphant
 Marne Valley
 Martin Washpool
 Martindale Hall
 Mary Seymour
 Media Island
 Messent
 Middlecamp Hills
 Mimbara
 Minlacowie
 Moana Sands
 Mokota
 Monarto
 Monarto Woodlands
 Montacute
 Moody Tank
 Morgan
 Morialta
 Mount Billy
 Mount Boothby
 Mount Brown
 Mount Dutton Bay
 Mount George
 Mount Magnificent
 Mount Monster
 Mount Scott
 Mount Taylor
 Mowantjie Willauwar
 Mullinger Swamp
 Munyaroo
 Murrunatta
 Mylor
 Myponga
 Nene Valley
 Nepean Bay
 Neptune Islands
 Newland Head
 Ngarkat
 Ngaut Ngaut
 Nicolas Baudin Island
 Nixon-Skinner
 Nuyts Archipelago
 Nuyts Reef
 Olive Island
 Padthaway
 Pandappa
 Para Wirra
 Paranki Lagoon
 Parndana
 Peachna
 Peebinga
 Pelican Lagoon
 Penambol
 Penguin Island
 Penola
 Piccaninnie Ponds
 Pigface Island
 Pike River
 Pine Hill Soak
 Pinkawillinie
 Point Bell
 Point Davenport
 Point Labatt
 Pooginook
 Poonthie Ruwe
 Porter Scrub
 Pualco Range
 Pullen Island
 Pureba
 Ramco Point
 Ramsay
 Red Banks
 Reedy Creek
 Ridley
 Rilli Island
 Rocky Island (North)
 Rocky Island (South)
 Roonka
 Rudall
 Salt Lagoon Islands
 Sandy Creek
 Sceale Bay
 Scott
 Scott Creek
 Seal Bay
 Searcy Bay
 Seddon
 Shannon
 Sheoak Hill
 Simpson
 Sinclair Island
 Sir Joseph Banks Group
 Sleaford Mere
 Spring Gully
 Spring Mount
 Stipiturus
 Swan Reach
 Talapar
 Talisker
 Tallaringa
 Tantanoola Caves
 Telford Scrub
 The Dutchmans Stern
 The Knoll
 The Pages
 The Plug Range
 Thidna
 Tilley Swamp
 Torrens Island
 Troubridge Island
 Tucknott Scrub
 Tumby Island
 Venus Bay
 Verran Tanks
 Vivigani Ardune
 Vivonne Bay
 Wabma Kadarbu Mound Springs
 Wahgunyah
 Waitpinga
 Waldegrave Islands
 Wanilla
 Wanilla Land Settlement
 Warren
 Warrenben
 West Island
 Wharminda
 Whidbey Isles
 White Dam
 Whyalla
 Wiljani
 Wills Creek
 Winninowie
 Wittelbee
 Woakwine
 Wolseley Common
 Yalpara
 Yeldulknie
 Yulte
 Yumbarra

Former conservation parks include Cape Hart, Cape Torrens, Cleland, Ediacara, Eurilla, Investigator Group, Isles of St Francis, Mount Rescue, Mount Shaugh, Munga-Thirri–Simpson Desert Conservation Park, Naracoorte Caves, Port Gawler and Scorpion Springs, Spaniards Gully, Telowie Gorge, Western River, and Wirrabara Range.

Game Reserves
Game reserves are "areas set aside for conservation of wildlife and the management of game for seasonal hunting". As of March 2018, the following game reserves have been declared:

Former game reserves include Coorong and Katarapko.

Recreation Parks

Recreation parks are 'areas managed for public recreation and enjoyment in a natural setting.' As of March 2018, the following recreation parks have been declared:

Regional Reserves

Regional reserves are "areas proclaimed for the purpose of conserving wildlife or natural or historical features while allowing responsible use of the area's natural resources". As of March 2018,  the following regional reserves had been declared(since November 2021 excluding Lake Frome and Munga-Thirri–Simpson Desert, since they were converted into national parks):

Other South Australian legislation

Conservation Reserves

Conservation reserves are a parcels of 'land set aside for conservation of natural and cultural features under the Crown Land Management Act 2009.'

Native Forest Reserves
The Forestry Act 1950 allows for the declaration of forest reserves for ‘purposes relating to the conservation, development and management of land supporting native flora and fauna…’ Native forest reserves are administered by the South Australian Forestry Corporation (trading as ForestrySA) which is a wholly owned state government business. As of March 2014, the following native forest reserves which are located in the Southern Flinders Ranges, the Mount Lofty Ranges and the Limestone Coast have been declared:

Wilderness Protection Areas
The Wilderness Protection Act 1992 was established in 1992 to provide for ‘the protection of wilderness and the restoration of land to its condition before European colonisation’. The day-to-day administration of the act is carried out by DEW. As of March 2018, the following areas have been declared:

Protected zones for Historic Shipwreck sites
The Historic Shipwrecks Act 1981 which is administered by DEW allows for the creation of protected zones over land and water around historic shipwrecks. The following protected zones have been declared:

River Murray protection area
The River Murray Act 2003 which is administered by DEW has provision for ‘the protection and enhancement of the River Murray and related areas and ecosystems’.

As of September 2010, the following protection areas have been designated:

The floodplain of the River Murray within South Australia including Lake Alexandrina, Lake Albert and the Coorong.
The watershed of the following tributaries arising from the east side of the Mount Lofty Ranges - Marne, Bremer and Finniss rivers.

Aquatic reserves
The following areas have been declared under the Fisheries Management Act 2007 (SA). Aquatic reserves which are managed by the Department of Primary Industries & Regions (PIRSA), were 'established to protect the habitat, ecosystems and communities of the rich variety of underwater organisms found in the marine and estuarine waters of South Australia'. Aquatic reserves are considered to be IUCN Category II protected areas.

Adelaide Dolphin Sanctuary

Adelaide Dolphin Sanctuary (ADS) is a sanctuary area intended to protect the Indo-Pacific bottlenose dolphin (Tursiops aduncus) population residing in the Port Adelaide River estuary and Barker Inlet as well as protecting and enhancing the Port Adelaide River estuary and Barker Inlet. The sanctuary was declared under the Adelaide Dolphin Sanctuary Act 2005 and is managed by DEW.

Marine parks
Marine parks are marine protected areas located within the immediate onshore waters of SA set aside under the Marine Parks Act 2007 (SA) 'to preserve the biological diversity of the state's coastal, estuarine and marine environments while allowing ecologically sustainable use of the area's natural resources.' As of December 2013, the following marine parks have been declared:

Far West Coast Marine Park
Nuyts Archipelago Marine Park
West Coast Bays Marine Park
Investigator Marine Park
Thorny Passage Marine Park
Sir Joseph Banks Group Marine Park
Neptune Islands Group (Ron and Valerie Taylor) Marine Park
Gambier Islands Group Marine Park
Franklin Harbor Marine Park
Upper Spencer Gulf Marine Park
Eastern Spencer Gulf Marine Park
Southern Spencer Gulf Marine Park
Lower Yorke Peninsula Marine Park
Upper Gulf St Vincent Marine Park
Encounter Marine Park
Western Kangaroo Island Marine Park
Southern Kangaroo Island Marine Park
Upper South East Marine Park
Lower South East Marine Park

Arkaroola Protection Area

The Arkaroola Protection Act 2012 which commenced operation on 26 April 2012 was created to ‘establish the Arkaroola Protection Area; to provide for the proper management and care of the area; and to prohibit mining activities in the area’. The former lease which has not been stocked for over 30 years is operated for the purpose of conservation and tourism under the name, Arkaroola Wilderness Sanctuary. The protection area is reported as satisfying the definition of a "category II National Park".

Native vegetation heritage agreements
A native vegetation heritage agreements, usually known as a heritage agreement, is a legally binding agreement between a landowner and the Minister for Environment, Sustainability and Conservation where the landowner agrees to protect native vegetation in perpetuity. In return, the Minister may agree to reduce statutory fees such as local government rates or offer assistance in term of funding of works such as fencing or provision of expert advice to ‘protecting and improving the conservation value of the heritage agreement area’. The enabling legislation is the Native Vegetation Act 1991''. Land covered by heritage agreements is considered to meet IUCN Category III. A notable example is the Gluepot Reserve.

Australian government

World heritage site
As of March 2015, Naracoorte Caves National Park is the sole World Heritage Site located in South Australia. It was co-listed under the name “Australian Fossil Mammal Sites (Riversleigh / Naracoorte)” with Riversleigh located in Queensland during 1994 in recognition of the fossil assemblages present at both sites which are considered to be a “superb illustration of the key stages of evolution of Australia’s unique fauna”.

Ramsar sites
As a contracting party to the Convention on Wetlands of International Importance (known as the Ramsar Convention), Australia is encouraged ‘to nominate sites containing representative, rare or unique wetlands, or that are important for conserving biological diversity, to the List of Wetlands of International Importance’.
As of March 2014, the Australian Government has nominated the following Ramsar sites within South Australia:
 Banrock Station Wetland Complex 
 Bool and Hacks Lagoons 
 Coongie Lakes 
 Coorong and Lakes Alexandrina and Albert Wetland
 Piccaninnie Ponds Karst Wetlands 
 Riverland

Indigenous Protected Areas
An Indigenous Protected Area (IPA) is a voluntary agreement between owners of indigenous owned land (known as traditional owners) and the Australian government which is intended to ‘promote biodiversity and cultural resource conservation on indigenous owned land’. As of March 2014, there are six IPAs in existence within South Australia:

Antara-Sandy Bore 
Kalka-Pipalyatjara 
Mount Willoughby 
 Nantawarrina 
Watarru and Walalkara 
 Yalata

Biosphere reserves
Two biosphere reserves belonging to the UNESCO World Biosphere Reserve program are located within South Australia - the Mamungari Conservation Park and the Riverland Biosphere Reserve.

The Mamungari Conservation Park in western South Australia which was formerly known as the Unnamed Conservation Park is co-managed by its traditional owners and DEW.

The Riverland Biosphere Reserve is located in the Riverland near Renmark. Two of its components are Calperum and Taylorville Stations which were respectively purchased by the Chicago Zoological Society in 1993 and the Australian Landscape Trust in 2000 with the ownership being deeded to the Director of National Parks. Both properties are managed by the Australian Landscape Trust.

See also

Privately held reserves in South Australia

Footnotes

References

External links
 Parks SA homepage, formerly the National Parks and Wildlife Service
Primary Industries and Regions SA (PIRSA) Fisheries Aquatic reserves and marine parks
DEW Maritime Heritage homepage

 
South Australia
Protected areas